Sintayehu Vissa (born 29 July 29 1996) is an Ethiopian-born Italian professional middle-distance runner. She represented Italy at 2022 World Athletics Championships competing in the women's 1500 metres.

Vissa was the 2022 NCAA Division I 1500 m champion. She is the Italian indoor record holder for the mile.

Professional
In August 2022, Sinta Vissa signed a professional contract to be coached by Dathan Ritzenhein and train with On Athletics Club.

On 28 January 2023, she broke by 0.19 s Gabriella Dorio's 41-year-old Italian indoor mile record with a time of 4:28.71 at the NYRR Dr Sander Invitational in Fort Washington Avenue Armory. Vissa smashed her own record a few weeks later, running 4:24.54 at the Millrose Games in New York for sixth place.

Competition record

NCAA
As a Saint Leo Lions, Sintayehu Vissa earned 2019 All-Conference Sunshine State Conference Cross Country honors at the Sunshine State Championships during her first year in the United States from her hometown of Bertiolo, Italy.

She was a 2020 NCAA Division II USTFCCCA 800 metres All-American.

Vissa was a 1500 m champion at 2022 NCAA Division I T&F Championships and earned 5 NCAA Division I U.S. Track & Field and Cross Country Coaches Association All-American awards and 3 Southeastern Conference Championship titles as an Ole Miss Rebels. She ran a 4:04.64 1500 m in Castellón in June, the No. 4 time ever on the USTFCCCA all-time list.

Source

References

External links
 
 
 Sintayehu Vissa Ole Miss Rebels
 Sintayehu Vissa St Leo Lions

1996 births
Living people
Italian female middle-distance runners
World Athletics Championships athletes for Italy
Italian people of Ethiopian descent
Italian female athletes
Italian female hurdlers
Ole Miss Rebels women's track and field athletes
University of Mississippi alumni
Italian adoptees